The interlobar veins are veins of the renal circulation which drain the renal lobes.

External links
  - "Renal Vasculature: Efferent Arterioles & Peritubular Capillaries"
  - "Urinary System: neonatal kidney, vasculature"

Kidney anatomy